The Massacre at Corlears Hook of February 25, 1643 was a colonial massacre of forty Wecquaesgeek of all ages and genders on the Lower East Side of Manhattan, perpetrated by a force led  by Maryn Adriansen, acting under Willem Kieft, the Director of New Netherland.

Kieft sought to take advantage of Wappinger who had been driven south by the Mohawks and Mahicans and taken refuge at their old settlement of Rechtauck on Corlears Hook, fleeing to lands controlled by their erstwhile Dutch allies. Launched on the same night as the larger Pavonia Massacre in modern Jersey City, the pair of unprovoked attacks instigated the two years' Kieft's War.

An account comes from David Pietersz. de Vries, the chairman of Kieft's council on Native relations, which had been created amid conflict 1½ years earlier. Kieft had dissolved the Twelve Men just two weeks before the attacks, due to opposition to his war policy by De Vries and others. He described the events as follows:

References

1643 in the Dutch Empire
1643 in North America
Kieft's War
Lower East Side
Massacres of Native Americans
Wappinger
Massacres in 1643